Vladimir Yakovlevich Lutchenko (born January 2, 1949 in Ramenskoye, Soviet Union) is a retired ice hockey player who played in the Soviet Hockey League.

Lutchenko played for HC CSKA Moscow. He was inducted into the Russian and Soviet Hockey Hall of Fame in 1970. Lutchenko competed at the 1972 Winter Olympics and 1976 Winter Olympics.

References

External links
 
 
 
 

1949 births
HC CSKA Moscow players
Ice hockey players at the 1972 Winter Olympics
Ice hockey players at the 1976 Winter Olympics
Living people
Medalists at the 1972 Winter Olympics
Medalists at the 1976 Winter Olympics
New York Rangers scouts
Olympic gold medalists for the Soviet Union
Olympic ice hockey players of the Soviet Union
Olympic medalists in ice hockey
People from Ramensky District
Soviet ice hockey defencemen
Sportspeople from Moscow Oblast